Tèmítọ́pẹ́ Títílọlá Olúwatóbilọ́ba Fagbenle is a British female basketball player for Çukurova Basketbol. She was chosen for the Great Britain team at the 2012 Summer Olympics.

Personal life 
Fagbenle was born on 8 September 1992 to a Nigerian family in Baltimore, Maryland, and has eleven siblings, including actor O. T. Fagbenle, film producer Luti Fagbenle, and video producer Oladapo 'Daps' Fagbenle. Her family moved to London, United Kingdom when she was aged 2 and she began playing basketball at the Haringey Angels club. When she was fifteen she returned to the United States to study at Blair Academy in New Jersey.

Basketball career 

During her time at Blair Academy Fagbenle was voted on to the McDonald's All American High School team. She has represented Great Britain at the under-16, 18 and 20 levels and competed at the 2011 FIBA Europe Under-20 Championship held in Serbia.

She was named in the British team for the women's basketball tournament at the 2012 Summer Olympics in London having been fast-tracked into the senior side from the under-20s. She averaged 4.8 points, 4 rebounds, 1 assist, 1.2 blocks and 1 steal in 19.2 minutes per game. GB went 0-5 and failed to qualify from their group.

Her selection for the Olympics came after a 12-month period in which she was unable to play for the Harvard Crimson women's basketball team due to the National Collegiate Athletic Association (NCAA) declaring her ineligible. Fagbenle had taken the General Certificate of Secondary Education (GCSE) exam whilst at school in the UK and NCAA rules say that an athlete must be enrolled in college within two years of sitting for the exam; Fagbenle took an additional year to graduate from high school because she repeated a year after moving to the United States.

Career statistics

WNBA

Regular season

|-
|style="text-align:left;background:#afe6ba;"|  2017†
| align="left" | Minnesota
| 21 || 0 || 4.2 || .500 || .000 || .778 || 1.0 || 0.0 || 0.1 || 0.2 || 0.4 || 1.2
|-
| align="left" | 2018
| align="left" | Minnesota
| 30 || 2 || 9.4 || .506 || .000 || .696 || 2.0 || 0.6 || 0.3 || 0.3 || 0.7 || 3.1
|-
| align="left" | 2019
| align="left" | Minnesota
| 18 || 0 || 15.1 || .519 || .167 || .722 || 2.9 || 0.8 || 0.3 || 0.3 || 1.8 || 5.4
|-
| align="left" | Career
| align="left" | 3 years, 1 team
| 69 || 2 || 9.3 || .511 || .167 || .720 || 1.9 || 0.5 || 0.2 || 0.3 || 0.9 || 3.1

Playoffs

|-
|style="text-align:left;background:#afe6ba;"|  2017†
| align="left" | Minnesota
| 2 || 0 || 2.0 || .667 || .000 || .000 || 0.5 || 0.0 || 0.0 || 0.0 || 0.0 || 2.0
|-
| align="left" | 2018
| align="left" | Minnesota
| 1 || 0 || 24.0 || .875 || 1.000 || .000 || 4.0 || 1.0 || 1.0 || 0.0 || 0.0 || 15.0
|-
| align="left" | 2019
| align="left" | Minnesota
| 1 || 0 || 16.0 || .500 || .000 || .000 || 1.0 || 0.0 || 1.0 || 2.0 || 0.0 || 4.0
|-
| align="left" | Career
| align="left" | 3 years, 1 team
| 4 || 0 || 11.0 || .733 || 1.000 || .000 || 1.5 || 0.3 || 0.5 || 0.5 || 0.0 || 5.8

College

Harvard and Southern California statistics

Source

References

External links
Harvard Crimson bio
USC Trojans bio

Living people
1992 births
American emigrants to England
American women's basketball players
Basketball players at the 2012 Summer Olympics
Black British sportswomen
Blair Academy alumni
Centers (basketball)
English people of Yoruba descent
English women's basketball players
Harvard Crimson women's basketball players
McDonald's High School All-Americans
Minnesota Lynx draft picks
Minnesota Lynx players
Olympic basketball players of Great Britain
Parade High School All-Americans (girls' basketball)
Basketball players from Baltimore
USC Trojans women's basketball players
Yoruba sportspeople
American people of Yoruba descent
Sportspeople from London